His Temporary Wife is a lost 1920 American silent comedy film directed by Joseph Levering. It was released by W. W. Hodkinson.

Plot
As described in a film magazine, Annabelle Rose (De Remer) is employed as a nurse by aged millionaire Howard Eliot (Carleton), who desires beauty in the person who cares for him. He grows fond of her and asks her to marry him so that he can leave his millions to her instead of his son Arthur (Strong). She refuses, so he makes a new will and places an envelope in her hands that she is to open sixty days after his death. Howard dies and Annabelle is considered responsible. She finds it impossible to obtain work and after suffering and close to starvation she answers an advertisement for a temporary wife. It turns out that it was placed by Arthur who, by the terms of his father's will, must marry some other woman than Verna Devore (Boland), a fortune seeker whom his father opposed. Annabelle consents to the temporary arrangement after opening the letter after sixty days and discovering that she has inherited the Eliot fortune. Through the influence of Judge Laton (Breese), Verna is cast aside and Arthur's temporary wife becomes permanent.

Cast
Rubye De Remer as Annabelle Rose
Edmund Breese as Judge Laton
Eugene Strong as Arthur Eliot
Mary Boland as Verna Devore
William T. Carleton as Howard Eliot (credited as W. T. Carleton)
Armand Cortes as Leonard Devore

References

External links

1920 films
American silent feature films
Lost American films
Films based on short fiction
American black-and-white films
1920 comedy films
Silent American comedy films
Films distributed by W. W. Hodkinson Corporation
Films directed by Joseph Levering
1920 lost films
Lost comedy films
1920s American films